Seattle Cloud Cover is an outdoor glass bridge and sculpture by American artist Teresita Fernández, installed in  Olympic Sculpture Park in Seattle, Washington, in the United States. The bridge, which displays images of the "changing sky discovered in nature and art", was approved in 2004 and completed in 2006. The project marks Fernandez's first permanent publicly sited work. Seattle Cloud Cover is made of laminated glass with a "photographic design interlayer". The work was financed by the Olympic Sculpture Park Art Acquisition Fund in honor of the Seattle Art Museum's 75th anniversary.

See also
 2006 in art

References

External links

 
 Seattle Art Museum's Olympic Sculpture Park opens to the public on January 20-21, 2007. at HistoryLink.org

2006 establishments in Washington (state)
2006 sculptures
Bridges completed in 2006
Bridges in Seattle
Glass architecture
Glass works of art
Olympic Sculpture Park
Outdoor sculptures in Seattle
Pedestrian bridges in Washington (state)
Sculptures by American artists
Bridges in art